Saint-Martin-d'Arrossa is a commune in the Pyrénées-Atlantiques department in south-western France.

It is located in the former province of Lower Navarre.

The commune is served by the Ossès-Saint-Martin-d'Arrossa railway station, on the Bayonne to Saint-Jean-Pied-de-Port railway line, which is served by TER (local) services operated by the SNCF.

See also
Communes of the Pyrénées-Atlantiques department

References

Communes of Pyrénées-Atlantiques
Lower Navarre
Pyrénées-Atlantiques communes articles needing translation from French Wikipedia